This Is Not Happening is an American storytelling show hosted by Roy Wood Jr. The show was originally hosted by its creator, Ari Shaffir. It airs on American cable television network Comedy Central, and had its premiere on January 22, 2015. Episodes focus on comedians telling real life experiences comedically.

History
Beginning as a live show, This Is Not Happening later debuted exclusively on the Internet for its first two seasons. The show was taped at Cheetah's Strip Club in Hollywood, and featured comedians such as David Koechner, T.J. Miller, Natasha Leggero, Kumail Nanjiani, and Joe Rogan. Comedy Central later announced it would be given an eight episode first season on television, making it the first series to be adapted from its digital department to its cable network. In advance of the show's premiere, the first episode was available for streaming on Amazon on January 12, 2015. Comedians featured on the first cable season of the show include Marc Maron, Keegan-Michael Key, Paul Scheer, and Iliza Shlesinger. For the 4th season, Ari Shaffir was replaced by Daily Show correspondent Roy Wood Jr.

There are numerous bonus online segments unaired for television that have either Season intros with: Ari Shaffir in a wine-colored jacket with glasses (Season 1), Ari Shaffir in a denim suit with a low mohawk (Season 2), Ari Shaffir dressed in a purple & gold tux (Season 3) or Roy Wood Jr. (Season 4); as well as the show topic. These include:
 Season 1: Duncan Trussell (Brain on Drugs), Marc Maron (Brain on Drugs), Will Weldon (Battle), Kevin Christy (Romance), Giulia Rozzi (Emergency), Sean O'Connor (Wonder Years), Ms. Pat (Wonder Years), Cy Amundson (Travel), Bobby Lee (Friendship);
 Season 2: Ari & Mat Edgar (Psychedelia), Ben Roy (Crime), Artie Lange (Romance), Mark Normand (Romance), Bret Ernst (Bloodline), Christina Pazsitsky (Melee), Mike Lawrence (Disaster), Annie Lederman (Nostalgia), Ari & Al Madrigal (Karma), Solomon Georgio (Karma);
 Season 3: Joe List (Scumbag), Jessa Reed (Drugs), Dan St. Germain (Drugs), Pete Johansson (Mortality), Ryan Sickler (Blunder), Dave Ross (The Law), Aaron Berg (Romance), Sofiya Alexandra (Family), Scruncho (Rage); and
 Season 4: Tommy Pope (Filth), Brooks Wheelan (Romance), Krystyna Hutchinson (Romance), Pat Dixon (Nightmare), B-Phlat (Moms), Brandt Tobler (Dads), Chris Garcia (Combat), Doug Smith (Combat), and Kelsey Cook (Shame).

Online exclusives

This is Not Happening Presents: One Crazy Night (2013)

This is Not Happening Presents: Fisticuffs (2013–2014)

Television seasons

Season 1 (2015)

Season 2 (2016)

Season 3 (2016)

Season 4 (2018–19)

References

External links

Comedy Central Official Page

Comedy Central original programming
2010s American stand-up comedy television series
2015 American television series debuts
Storytelling television shows